The 1984 Princeton Tigers football team was an American football team that represented Princeton University during the 1984 NCAA Division I-AA football season. Princeton finished fifth in the Ivy League.

In their seventh year under head coach Frank Navarro, the Tigers compiled a 4–5 record and were outscored 192 to 185. Mark A. Berggren and Chalmer S. Taylor were the team captains.

Princeton's 3–4 conference record placed fifth in the Ivy League standings. The Tigers outscored Ivy opponents 162 to 137.

Princeton played its home games at Palmer Stadium on the university campus in Princeton, New Jersey.

Schedule

References

Princeton
Princeton Tigers football seasons
Princeton Tigers football